Elżbieta Rafalska (née Kajzer) (born 22 June 1955) is a Polish politician, and former Minister of Labour and Social Policy, serving 2015 to 2019. Since 2007, Rafalska has been a Member of the Sejm. She was previously the Deputy Minister of Labour and Social Policy, and has served as a Senator.

External links
 Official website

1955 births
Living people
Law and Justice politicians
Women government ministers of Poland
Members of the Polish Sejm 2007–2011
Members of the Polish Sejm 2011–2015
MEPs for Poland 2019–2024
Women MEPs for Poland
People from Wschowa